Live Without a Net is a live concert video of Van Halen recorded in New Haven, Connecticut, in 1986, and released later that year. It was of their performance on August 27, 1986 at New Haven's Veterans Memorial Coliseum. The 90-minute release removed a few songs from the full performance. While the band attempted to record the previous night, audio problems prevented it from being used, although some video footage from that night would later surface in music videos. The concerts were part of the 5150 Tour, supporting the album of the same name, Van Halen's first with lead singer Sammy Hagar.

Track listing
Introduction
"There's Only One Way to Rock" (Sammy Hagar)
"Summer Nights" (Michael Anthony, Hagar, Alex Van Halen, Eddie Van Halen)
"Get Up" (Anthony, Hagar, A. Van Halen, E. Van Halen)
"Drum Solo" (A. Van Halen)
"5150" (Anthony, Hagar, A. Van Halen, E. Van Halen)
"Best of Both Worlds" (Anthony, Hagar, A. Van Halen, E. Van Halen)
"Bass Solo" (Anthony)
"Panama" (Anthony, David Lee Roth, A. Van Halen, E. Van Halen)
"Love Walks In" (Anthony, Hagar, A. Van Halen, E. Van Halen)
"Guitar Solo"  (E. Van Halen)
"I Can't Drive 55" (Hagar)
"Ain't Talkin' 'Bout Love" (Anthony, Roth, A. Van Halen, E. Van Halen)
"Why Can't This Be Love" (Anthony, Hagar, A. Van Halen, E. Van Halen)
"Rock 'N' Roll" (John Bonham, John Paul Jones, Jimmy Page, Robert Plant)

Personnel
Michael Anthony – bass guitar, backing vocals
Sammy Hagar – lead vocals, guitar (2, 10, 12–15)
Alex Van Halen – drums, percussion
Eddie Van Halen – guitar, backing vocals, keyboards on "Love Walks In" and "Why Can't This Be Love"

Additional information
Songs appear in the concert film in a sequence that differs from the original performance, and at least four songs from the live show ("You Really Got Me", "Dreams", "Good Enough", and "Wild Thing") were omitted from the film entirely. Other edits to the concert were made, such as editing Eddie Van Halen's guitar solo slightly and cutting brief moments elsewhere from the night. The performance of "Best of Both Worlds", which included a portion of Robert Palmer's hit "Addicted to Love" was aired during the 1986 MTV Video Music Awards, but the Palmer section was edited out of the home video release. The same performance footage that aired during the MTV VMA's continued to include "Love Walks In", further illustrating the re-arranging of the playlist order for the edited home video version. Both aired in one continuous clip during the awards show. Continuity problems continued as displayed during the start of Eddie's guitar solo. At one point Eddie sticks his cigarette under the strings behind the nut. A few moments later, Eddie smokes his cigarette then discards it to the floor. A few seconds later the cigarette re-appears in its original place, behind the nut.
Another problem occurred when Eddie Van Halen's Kramer 5150 broke a string during "I Can't Drive 55". After the bridge of the song, while Sammy was soloing, Eddie picked up his Steinberger 5150 guitar and used it to finish the song and to perform "Ain't Talkin' 'Bout Love".

Originally released on VHS and Laserdisc, Live Without A Net was re-released on DVD in 2004 with both Stereo and Surround Sound - Dolby 5.1 and DTS mixes.
There is an Easter egg on the 2004 DVD, a short, silent clip of a man driving a small car and playing guitar. The clip is from the video Amsterdam by the band Guster. It can be accessed by opening the VTS files on your computer.

Certifications

|-

References

Van Halen video albums
1987 video albums
Live video albums
1987 live albums
Van Halen live albums
Warner Music Vision live albums
Warner Music Vision video albums